San Diego United was an American soccer team based in San Diego, California, United States. Founded in 2008, the team was a member of the National Premier Soccer League (NPSL), a national amateur league at the fourth tier of the American Soccer Pyramid. The team and Southwest Division went on hiatus from the NPSL for the 2009 season due to a lack of teams in the Southwest Division after the 2008 season. As of 2010 neither the Southwest Division nor SD United are listed as being part of NPSL.

The team played its home games in Torero Stadium. The team's colors were black, white, red and gold.

The team had a sister organization, also called San Diego United, which plays in the Women's Premier Soccer League.

History

Players

Current roster

Notable former players

Steve Bruce
Leslie Cunningham

Year-by-year

Honors
 NPSL Southwest Division Champions 2008
National Champions 2008

Head coaches
  Jason Heth (2008)
  Guy Newman (2009–2010)

Stadia
 Valhalla Stadium at Valhalla High School; El Cajon, California (2008)
 Torero Stadium; San Diego, California (2009–present)
 Stadium at Granite Hills High School; El Cajon, California 2 games (2009)

External links
San Diego United

U
National Premier Soccer League teams
2008 establishments in California
2009 disestablishments in California